In music, Op. 140 stands for Opus number 140. Compositions that are assigned this number include:

 Raff – Symphony No. 2
 Saint-Saëns – The Promised Land
 Schubert – Sonata in C major for piano four-hands, D 812 (Grand Duo)
 Schumann –  "Vom Pagen und der Königstochter" for solo voice, chorus, and orchestra
 Shostakovich – Six Romances on Verses by English Poets